Archips inopinatanus is a species of moth of the family Tortricidae. It is found in Primorsky Krai in the Russian Far East.

References

Moths described in 1901
Archips
Moths of Asia